
Year 207 BC was a year of the pre-Julian Roman calendar. At the time it was known as the Year of the Consulship of Nero and Salinator (or, less frequently, year 547 Ab urbe condita). The denomination 207 BC for this year has been used since the early medieval period, when the Anno Domini calendar era became the prevalent method in Europe for naming years.

Events 
 By place 

 Roman Republic 
 The Roman general Gaius Claudius Nero fights an indecisive battle with the Carthaginian general Hannibal at Grumentum. Nero is unable to stop Hannibal's advance into Canusium. Nevertheless, he rapidly marches the elite parts of his army some one hundred kilometres north to reinforce the army of Marcus Livius Salinator.
 The Battle of the Metaurus, fought near the Metaurus River in Umbria, is a pivotal battle during the Second Punic War between Rome and Carthage. The Carthaginians are led by Hannibal's brother Hasdrubal Barca, and the Roman armies are led by the consuls Marcus Livius Salinator and Gaius Claudius Nero. The Carthaginian army is defeated by the Romans and Hasdrubal is killed in the battle. This major loss by the Carthaginians ends Hannibal's hopes of success in Italy.

 Greece 
 The general leading the Achaean League, Philopoemen, introduces heavier Macedonian armour and phalanx tactics. His army then crushes the Spartans under the Spartan regent and general, Machanidas, in the battle of Mantinea. Machanidas is killed by Philopoemen during the battle.
 Nabis, a Syrian sold into slavery, rises to power in Sparta and becomes regent of the young Spartan king, Pelops, following the death of Machanidas. Nabis soon overthrows Pelops, claiming to be a descendant of the Eurypontid Spartan king Demaratus. Nabis then starts a social revolution which will lead to the freeing of all the helots, the destruction of the ruling oligarchy, the redistribution of land and the cancelling of debts.

 Vietnam 
 When king An Dương Vương dies, so does his dynasty and the Triệu dynasty and the kingdom of Nam Việt are established.

 China 
 The Chu rebel Xiang Yu defeats the Qin general Zhang Han in the Battle of Julu and becomes the leader of the rebellion against the Qin dynasty.
 Xiang Yu defeats Zhang Han in the Battle of the Yushui River. Zhang Han then surrenders to Xiang Yu.
 Emperor Qin Er Shi of the Qin dynasty is assassinated by Prime Minister Zhao Gao. He is replaced by his nephew Ziying, who in turn assassinates Zhao Gao. Ziying takes power as the king of Qin rather than as emperor.
 The Chu rebel Liu Bang invades Guanzhong. After another military defeat, Ziying surrenders to Liu, who then occupies the Qin capital Xianyang. This marks the end of the Qin dynasty.

Births

Deaths 
 June 22 – Hasdrubal Barca, Carthaginian general in the Second Punic War (b. 245 BC)
 date unknown
 An Dương Vương, King of Nam Việt since 257 BC
 Chrysippus, Greek philosopher from Soloi who was the principal systematiser of Stoic philosophy (b. c. 280 BC)
 Hasdrubal Barca, Carthaginian general who has unsuccessfully attempted to sustain Carthage's military ascendancy on the Spanish peninsula in the face of Roman attacks (b. 245 BC)
 Machanidas, Spartan general and regent (killed in the battle of Mantinea)
 Qin Er Shi, Emperor of the Qin dynasty of China (assassinated) (b. 229 BC)
 Simuka, Indian king from 230 BC and the founder of the Satavahana dynasty (b. 230 BC)
 Zhao Gao, Chief eunuch in the service of the Emperors of the Qin dynasty of China (assassinated)

References